Souvenirs is a greatest hits album from American country music artist Vince Gill. It was released in 1995 on MCA Nashville. Gill's duet version with Dolly Parton on her classic composition "I Will Always Love You", concurrently included on this recording and Parton's Something Special album was released as a single in late 1995, reaching the top-twenty on the U.S. country singles chart.

Track listing

Chart performance

Weekly charts

Year-end charts

Certifications

References

1995 greatest hits albums
Vince Gill albums
MCA Records compilation albums